The 105th New York State Legislature, consisting of the New York State Senate and the New York State Assembly, met from January 3 to June 2, 1882, during the third year of Alonzo B. Cornell's governorship, in Albany.

Background
Under the provisions of the New York Constitution of 1846, 32 Senators and 128 assemblymen were elected in single-seat districts; senators for a two-year term, assemblymen for a one-year term. The senatorial districts were made up of entire counties, except New York County (seven districts) and Kings County (three districts). The Assembly districts were made up of entire towns, or city wards, forming a contiguous area, all within the same county.

At this time there were two major political parties: the Republican Party and the Democratic Party. The Greenback Party and the Prohibition Party also nominated tickets.

Elections
The 1881 New York state election was held on November 8. Of the statewide elective offices up for election, five were carried by the Republicans and one by a Democrat. The approximate party strength at this election, as expressed by the vote for Secretary of State, was: Republican 417,000; Democratic 404,000; Greenback 16,000; and Prohibition 4,500.

Sessions
The Legislature met for the regular session at the State Capitol in Albany on January 3, 1882; and adjourned on June 2.

The Senate had 15 Republicans, 14 Democrats and 3 Tammany men; the Assembly had 61 Republicans, 59 Democrats and 8 Tammany men. In both Houses, the Tammany men were in a balance of power position, and deadlock ensued. Tammany Boss John Kelly objected to the election of John C. Jacobs as president pro tempore of the State Senate, and the office remained vacant throughout the session.

On February 2, Charles E. Patterson (D) was elected Speaker with 59 votes against 51 for Thomas G. Alvord (R).

On February 20, John W. Vrooman (R) was re-elected Clerk of the State Senate with the votes of the Tammany men; and the right to appoint the standing committees was transferred to Lt. Gov. George G. Hoskins (R).

State Senate

Districts

 1st District: Queens and Suffolk counties
 2nd District: 1st, 2nd, 5th, 6th, 8th, 9th, 10th, 12th and 22nd Ward of the City of Brooklyn, and the towns of Flatbush, Gravesend and New Utrecht in Kings County
 3rd District: 3rd, 4th, 7th, 11th, 13th, 19th, 20th, 21st and 23rd Ward of the City of Brooklyn
 4th District: 14th, 15th, 16th, 17th, 18th, 24th and 25th Ward of the City of Brooklyn, and the towns of New Lots and Flatlands in Kings County
 5th District: Richmond County and the 1st, 2nd, 3rd, 5th, 6th, 8th, 14th and parts of the 4th and 9th Ward of New York City
 6th District: 7th, 11th, 13th and part of the 4th Ward of NYC
 7th District: 10th, 17th and part of the 15th, 18th and 21st Ward of NYC
 8th District: 16th and part of the 9th, 15th, 18th, 20th and 21st Ward of NYC
 9th District: Part of the 18th, 19th and 21st Ward of NYC
 10th District: Part of the 12th, 19th, 20th, 21st and 22nd Ward of NYC
 11th District: 23rd and 24th, and part of the 12th, 20th and 22nd Ward of NYC
 12th District: Rockland and Westchester counties
 13th District: Orange and Sullivan counties
 14th District: Greene, Schoharie and Ulster counties
 15th District: Columbia, Dutchess and Putnam counties
 16th District: Rensselaer and Washington counties
 17th District: Albany County
 18th District: Fulton, Hamilton, Montgomery, Saratoga and Schenectady counties
 19th District: Clinton, Essex and Warren counties
 20th District: Franklin, Lewis and St. Lawrence counties
 21st District: Oswego and Jefferson counties
 22nd District: Oneida County
 23rd District: Herkimer, Madison and Otsego counties
 24th District: Chenango, Delaware and Broome counties
 25th District: Onondaga and Cortland counties
 26th District: Cayuga, Seneca, Tompkins and Tioga counties
 27th District: Allegany, Chemung and Steuben counties
 28th District:  Ontario, Schuyler, Wayne and Yates counties
 29th District: Monroe and Orleans counties
 30th District: Genesee, Livingston, Niagara and Wyoming counties
 31st District: Erie County
 32nd District: Cattaraugus and Chautauqua counties

Note: There are now 62 counties in the State of New York. The counties which are not mentioned in this list had not yet been established, or sufficiently organized, the area being included in one or more of the abovementioned counties.

Members
The asterisk (*) denotes members of the previous Legislature who continued in office as members of this Legislature. Charles H. Russell, John W. Browning and Shepard P. Bowen changed from the Assembly to the Senate.

Employees
 Clerk: John W. Vrooman
 Sergeant-at-Arms: John W. Corning
 Doorkeeper: Charles F. Brady
 Stenographer: Hudson C. Tanner

State Assembly

Assemblymen
The asterisk (*) denotes members of the previous Legislature who continued as members of this Legislature.

Employees
 Clerk: Edward M. Johnson, from February 15
 Sergeant-at-Arms: vacant
 Doorkeeper: Henry Wheeler
 Stenographer: James M. Ruso

Notes

Sources
 Civil List and Constitutional History of the Colony and State of New York compiled by Edgar Albert Werner (1884; see pg. 276 for Senate districts; pg. 291 for senators; pg. 298–304 for Assembly districts; and pg. 380f for assemblymen)
 Sketches of the Members of the Legislature in The Evening Journal Almanac (1882)
 THE ASSEMBLY COMMITTEES in The New York Times on February 15, 1882

105
1882 in New York (state)
1882 U.S. legislative sessions